Tisserand is a French occupational surname meaning "weaver". Notable people with the surname include:

 Félix Tisserand (1845–1896), French astronomer
 Marcel Tisserand (b. 1993), Congolese footballer

See also
 3663 Tisserand (minor planet)
 Tisserand (crater)
 Tisserand's criterion
 Tisserand's parameter
 Tisserand Hydroplum
 Tisseur
 Le Tellier

French-language surnames